Soufiane Talal (born 26 May 1991) is a Moroccan professional footballer who plays as a midfielder for Iraq Division One club Al-Minaa.

Career

Club
Talal was promoted as a player in all age teams of the Raja CA, and he previously played in his country with the Maghreb de Fès, AS Salé, Hassania Agadir and CR Al Hoceima. In January 2019, he played professionally in the Kuwait Premier League for Al-Salmiya, and returned to his country in January 2020 to sign a contract with Raja Beni Mellal.

In February 2021, Talal moved to play in the Iraqi Premier League, signing a contract with Al-Najaf. In August 2022, he signed a contract with the largest Iraqi club, Al-Zawraa.

In January 2023, Talal signed a contract with Al-Minaa, which was recently relegated to the Iraq Division One.

References

External links 
 
 Soufiane Talal at Playmakerstats
 

1991 births
Living people
Footballers from Casablanca
Moroccan footballers
Association football midfielders
Botola players
Raja CA players
Maghreb de Fès players
Hassania Agadir players
AS FAR (football) players
Chabab Rif Al Hoceima players
Al Salmiya SC players
Najaf FC players
Al-Zawraa SC players
Al-Mina'a SC players
Moroccan expatriate footballers
Moroccan expatriate sportspeople in Kuwait
Expatriate footballers in Kuwait
Expatriate footballers in Iraq